Gallinaro is a comune (municipality) in the Province of Frosinone in the Italian Lazio region.

Geography
Gallinaro is located in the Comino Valley and is crossed by Rio Mollo, a tributary river of Melfa. It borders the municipalities of Alvito, Atina, Picinisco, San Donato Val di Comino and  Settefrati.

History
The town was first mentioned in 1023, probably founded by the counts of Sora. In 1067 it became property of the counts of Aquino. The sanctuary of St. Gerard was built in the 13th century.

Main sights
Old town
St. Gerard Sanctuary (12th century)
Church of St. John (14th century)
Child Jesus of Gallinaro

People
Loreto Apruzzese (1765-1833), theologian and jurist
Paolo Tullio (1949-2015), chef, restaurateur, critic

References

External links

 Official website 
Office of Tourism of Gallinaro 
 

Cities and towns in Lazio